Roger E. Kanet (born 1936) is professor emeritus of political science and former Associate Vice Chancellor for Academic Affairs (1989-1997), University of Illinois at Urbana-Champaign, and professor emeritus of political science and former Dean of the School of International Studies (1997-2000), University of Miami.

Educational career
Roger E. Kanet (1936) – political scientist, professor emeritus of political science and former Associate Vice Chancellor for Academic Affairs (1989-1997), University of Illinois at Urbana-Champaign, and professor emeritus of political science and former Dean of the School of International Studies (1997-2000), University of Miami

Works
Kanet is an extremely productive researcher. He has been the primary editor for 36 edited books and 5 special issues of journals. He has contributed over 155 chapters to edited volumes and published 95 peer-reviewed journal articles.  He has also been the general editor for 34 book that appear in series. Recent edited/coedited works include Russian Foreign Policy in the 21st Century, The New Security Environment: The Impact On Russia, Central And Eastern Europe, and A Resurgent Russia and the West: The European Union, NATO and Beyond, "Power, Politics and Confrontation in Eurasia:  Foreign Policy in a Contested Region","Russia, Eurasia and the New Geopolitics of Energy: Confrontation and Consolidation","Routledge Handbook of Russian Security", "Russia and the World in the Putin Era: From Theory to Reality in Russian Global Strategy"   
<

Teaching interests
Kanet's major teaching and research interests focused on post-communist Europe, on questions of European and global security, democratization and nationalism, both in a comparative perspective, and on aspects of U.S. foreign and security policy. He also taught a course entitled the World before European Domination.

Kanet supervised many PhD candidates and views his accomplishments as a mentor as highly important. He has overseen 41 successful dissertations through 2019 and served on another 23 committees.

References

Kanet's biography is included, among other sources, in
American Men and Women of Science; 
Cambridge Blue Book of Foremost International Intellectuals; 
Great Minds of the 21st Century; 
Who's Who in America;  
Who's Who in American Education; 
Who's Who in the Midwest; 
Who's Who in the South and Southwest; 
Who's Who in the 21st Century; 
Who's Who in the World;  
Who's Who of Professionals (since 1998);

Kanet has received awards, among others, from
Albert Nelson Marquis Lifetime Achievement Award;
2018 Top 100 Registry Professor of the Year in Florida;
Strathmore’s WHO’S WHO. Lifetime Member;
Roundtable Magazine, Certificate of Achievement;
Distinguished Scholar Award Post-Communist Studies Section, International Studies Association;

External links
 Current CV
   The Program in Arms Control, Disarmament, and International Security's bio on Kanet
 Kanet's amazon book listing
Kanet's Palgrave Macmillan's Author Page

Living people
American political scientists
St. Xavier High School (Ohio) alumni
1936 births